Wendell Bell (September 27, 1924 – November 3, 2019) was a futurist and Professor Emeritus of Sociology at Yale University. His areas of specialization included sociology, social class, race, family life and future studies.

Early career
During World War II, Bell was a naval aviator and served in the Philippines.

Bell graduated in Social Sciences from California State University, Fresno in 1948. He then attained his Ph.D. from UCLA in 1952 and served on the faculties of Stanford University (1952-4; directed Stanford Survey Research Facility), Northwestern University (1954–57), and UCLA (1957–63; headed West Indies Study Program). From 1963 to 1964, he was a Fellow at the Center for Advanced Study in the Behavioral Sciences at Stanford, California.

Yale career
Joining the Yale faculty in 1963, Bell went on to become chairman of the Yale Department of Sociology and helped found the Yale Program of African American Studies. He retired from Yale in 1995.

Research interests
While Bell's early research interests focused on the sociology of US cities, and some later research interests focused on the sociology of Caribbean countries (Bell served as president of the Caribbean Studies Association from 1979 to 1980), Bell is primarily known for his research and other works as a futurist.

Futurist career
Bell worked as a professional futurist for over 40 years. The World Futures Studies Federation awarded him a Lifetime Achievement Award in 2005. In 2008, the Association of Professional Futurists selected Bell's two-volume work The Foundations of Futures Studies as one of the ten most important futures studies books.

References

1924 births
2019 deaths
American futurologists
American sociologists
Northwestern University faculty
Military personnel from Chicago
People from Fresno, California
Stanford University faculty
United States Navy pilots of World War II
California State University, Fresno alumni
University of California, Los Angeles alumni
University of California, Los Angeles faculty
Yale University faculty
Military personnel from California